The Intruder is a 2004 French drama film directed by Claire Denis. The film had its world premiere in the Competition section at the 61st Venice International Film Festival on 9 September 2004. It was released in France on 4 May 2005.

Plot
Louis Trebor, an ex-mercenary living in the Jura Mountains, is suffering increasingly from a heart condition. He abandons his home, beloved dogs, and estranged son in pursuit of a black market heart transplant in Korea before traveling to Tahiti, where he spent time in his youth, in the hope of connecting with a son he has never met.

Cast

Production
The film is inspired by a brief essay of the same name by Jean-Luc Nancy. Claire Denis also takes inspiration from Robert Louis Stevenson's writing and Paul Gauguin's South Seas paintings. A footage from Paul Gégauff's film Le Reflux is used in the film.

Release
The film had its world premiere in the Competition section at the 61st Venice International Film Festival on 9 September 2004. It was released in France on 4 May 2005.

Reception
On review aggregator website Rotten Tomatoes, the film holds an approval rating of 86% based on 29 reviews, and an average rating of 6.8/10. The website's critical consensus reads, "The impressionistic narrative may confound the viewer, but Denis crafts wonderfully poetic, dreamlike imagery." On Metacritic, the film has a weighted average score of 85 out of 100, based on 13 critics, indicating "universal acclaim".

Amy Taubin of Film Comment commented that "Denis is one of cinema's greatest narrative poets, and The Intruder, the story of an adventurer, is her most adventurous cinematic poem." Jay Weissberg of Variety wrote, "More opaque than her past works and unlikely to garner her new fans, Denis gives near equal weight to reality, dreams, nightmares and premonitions, resisting a traditional narrative in order to question the possibilities of escape within the modern world."

Slant Magazine placed the film at number 77 on the "100 Best Films of the Aughts" list.

References

Further reading

 Dooley, Kath. "Foreign Bodies, Community and Trauma in the Films of Claire Denis: Beau Travail (1999), 35 Rhums (2008) and White Material (2009)." Screening the Past (2013). Accessed May 25, 2017. 
 Morrey, Douglas. "Open Wounds: Body and Image in Jean-Luc Nancy and Claire Denis." Film-Philosophy 12, no. 1 (2008): 10–30.  
 Nayman, Adam. "Best of the Decade #7: L′Intrus: Second Helpings." Reverse Shot (December 25, 2009). Museum of the Moving Image. Accessed June 4, 2017. 
 Smith, Damon. "L’Intrus: An Interview with Claire Denis." Senses of Cinema 35 (2005). Accessed May 25, 2017. 
 Sweeney, R. Emmet. "The Hither Side of Solutions. Bodies and Landscape in L’intrus." Senses of Cinema (2005), no. 36. Accessed May 25, 2017.

External links
 

2004 films
2004 drama films
French drama films
2000s French-language films
Films directed by Claire Denis
2000s French films